Bangana lippus is a species of cyprinid fish found in the Mekong drainage in Laos, China, and Myanmar.

References

Bangana
Fish described in 1936
Taxa named by Henry Weed Fowler
Taxobox binomials not recognized by IUCN